Tiaan Louw (born 10 June 1988) is a Namibian cricketer. He is a right-handed batsman and right-arm medium-pace bowler.

Louw made his debut for the Namibian Under-19 team in the Africa/East Asia and Pacific Championship in 2005, playing three games, but not batting in the tournament, in a competition in which Namibia were victorious, beating Uganda's Under-19 team in the final.

Two years later, he played for Namibia in the Africa Under-19 Championship, playing five games for the victorious Namibian side.

He played four games in the 2007-08 Under-19 World Cup, in which Namibia finished in tenth place.

Louw made his List A debut in the 2009-10 season, against the United Arab Emirates. He scored 12 runs in the match, which the United Arab Emirates won by two wickets.

References

External links
Tiaan Louw at Cricket Archive 

1988 births
Living people
Namibian cricketers